The Hai'an–Yangkou Port railway, also known as Rudong railway, is a single-track railway branch in Nantong, Jiangsu Province, China.

History
Construction began in 2008. The line was completed in 2012. Passenger service began on 16 January 2014.

Route
The line diverges from the Nanjing–Qidong railway south of Hai'an railway station and continues east.

Stations
Hai'an
Xichang (freight)
Bencha

Rudong
Beiyu (freight)

References

Railway lines in China
Railway lines opened in 2012